Poly(dichlorophosphazene), also called dichlorophosphazine polymer or phosphonitrilechloride polymer, is a chemical compound with formula (PNCl2)n.  It is an inorganic (hence carbon-free)  chloropolymer, whose backbone is a chain of alternating phosphorus and nitrogen atoms, connected by alternating single and double covalent bonds.

The compound can be prepared by polymerization of hexachlorophosphazene ((PNCl2)3) by heating to ca. 250 °C. It is an "inorganic rubber" and the starting material for many other polymers with the -P=N- backbone (polyphosphazenes), which have important commercial uses.

History
Poly(dichlorophosphazene) was discovered by H. N. Stokes in the 19th century, and at that time its superior properties over natural rubber were already noted.  In 1965, Harry R. Allcock at Pennsylvania State University synthesized a soluble form of the polymer, which opened the doors to the development of many derivatives.

Uses
Poly(dichlorophosphazene) is not water-resistant.  However, it is soluble in organic solvents such as THF and benzene, wherein it can be derivatized by replacement of the chlorine atoms with -OR or -NR2 groups (R = alkyl, aryl) to yield many other polyphosphazenes.  Some of these organically modified polymers are hydrolytically stable and exhibit some attractive properties such as low glass transition temperatures.

References

Inorganic polymers
Phosphazenes
Inorganic phosphorus compounds
Inorganic chlorine compounds
Inorganic nitrogen compounds